Rudolf Kirs (16 June 1915, Brandýs nad Labem – 8 July 1963 Prague) was a Czech cellist. He was the concert master of the Prague Radio Symphony Orchestra from 1953 to 1963.

1915 births
1963 deaths
People from Brandýs nad Labem-Stará Boleslav
Czechoslovak cellists
20th-century cellists